The Football Federation of Guinea-Bissau (FFGB) is the governing body of football in Guinea-Bissau. It was founded in 1974, and affiliated to FIFA and to CAF in 1986. It organizes the national football league and the national team.

Crest

External links
 Guinea-Bissau at the FIFA website.
  Guinea-Bissau at CAF Online

Guinea-Bissau
Football in Guinea-Bissau
1974 establishments in Guinea-Bissau
Sports organizations established in 1974
Football